Thrilling Cities is the title of a travelogue by the James Bond author and The Sunday Times journalist Ian Fleming. The book was first published in the UK in November 1963 by Jonathan Cape. The cities covered by Fleming were Hong Kong,Macau,Tokyo, Honolulu, Los Angeles, Las Vegas, Chicago, New York, Hamburg, Berlin, Vienna, Geneva, Naples and Monte Carlo.

Thrilling Cities was initially a series of articles Fleming wrote for The Sunday Times, based on two trips he took. The first trip was in 1959, in which he travelled around the world, and the second was in 1960, in which he drove around Europe.

The first trip was at the behest of The Sunday Timess features editor Leonard Russell; the paper's chairman, Roy Thomson, enjoyed the series so much he requested Fleming undertake a second trip. The book version includes material edited out of the original articles, as well as photographs of the various cities.

Synopsis
Thrilling Cities is Ian Fleming's view of thirteen cities he visited in two trips in 1959 and 1960. The cities covered are: Hong Kong, Macau, Tokyo, Honolulu, Los Angeles and Las Vegas (the two cities are examined in one chapter), Chicago, New York, Hamburg, Berlin, Vienna, Geneva, Naples and Monte Carlo.

Fleming's account is highly personal and deals with his visit and his experiences and impressions. Each chapter closes with what Fleming called "Incidental Intelligence", dealing with the hotels, restaurants, food and nightlife.

Background
In 1959 the features editor of The Sunday Times, Leonard Russell, suggested to Ian Fleming that he take a five-week, all-expenses-paid trip around the world for a series of features for the paper. Fleming declined, saying he was a terrible tourist who "often advocated the provision of roller-skates at the door of museums and art galleries". Russell persuaded him, pointing out that Fleming could also get some material for the Bond books in the process.

Fleming took £500 (£ in  pounds) of travellers cheques for expenses and flew BOAC to his first stop, Hong Kong. He was guided around the city by his friend Richard Hughes, the Australian correspondent for The Sunday Times; Hughes was later the model for the character Dikko Henderson in You Only Live Twice, as well as for "Old Craw" in John le Carré's The Honourable Schoolboy.

Fleming stayed just three days in Hong Kong, before he and Hughes flew to Tokyo where they were joined by Torao Saito—also known as "Tiger"—a journalist with the Asahi Shimbun newspaper group. Saito later became the model for the character Tiger Tanaka in You Only Live Twice. Fleming spent three days in Tokyo and decided there would be "no politicians, museums, temples, Imperial palaces or Noh plays, let alone tea ceremonies" on his itinerary; he instead visited a judo academy, a Japanese soothsayer and the Kodokan, a local gymnasium.

Fleming left Tokyo on Friday the 13th to fly to Hawaii; 2,000 miles into the Pacific one of the Douglas DC-6's engines caught fire and the plane nearly crashed, although it managed to make an emergency landing on Wake Island. After Honolulu, Fleming moved on to Los Angeles, where he visited a number of places he had been before, including the Los Angeles Police Intelligence headquarters, where he again met Captain James Hamilton, much as he had done during his research for Diamonds Are Forever.

By the time Fleming got to New York he was fed up with travelling and his biographer, Andrew Lycett notes that "his sour mood transferred to the city and indeed the country he had once loved". The series opened in The Sunday Times on 24 January 1960, with an introduction from Fleming, followed by the article on Hong Kong the following week. The series finished on 28 February 1960 with the article about Chicago and New York.

Roy Thomson, the chairman of The Sunday Times, enjoyed Fleming's articles and suggested a number of other cities, including Rio de Janeiro, Buenos Aires, Havana, New Orleans and Montreal. Others, such as The Sunday Times editor Harry Hodson, were less enthusiastic; Hodson considered that "more serious readers have tut-tutted a bit about missing the really important things".

Fleming planned to drive most of his second tour of cities, which concentrated on places he wanted to visit in Europe. For the trip he took his own car, a Ford Thunderbird convertible, crossing the channel and journeying through Ostend, Antwerp and Bremen before arriving at his first destination: Hamburg. He stayed only briefly in the city, praising the sex industry by writing "how very different from the prudish and hypocritical manner in which we so disgracefully mismanage these things in England". Fleming moved on to Berlin, where he was shown round the city by The Sunday Times correspondent Anthony Terry and his wife Rachel. Terry took Fleming into East Berlin and told him many of the details about Operation Stopwatch, the Anglo-American attempt to tunnel into the Soviet-occupied zone to tap into landline communication of the Soviet Army headquarters. In comparison to Hamburg, Fleming thought Berlin was "sinister".

Fleming moved on to Vienna and found the city boring, calling it "clean, tidy, God-fearing", before travelling into Geneva. He met Ingrid Etler, a journalist and old girlfriend, who was resident in the city and who provided him with much of his background material. Fleming then travelled to Les Avants, the villa near Montreux of his close friend Noël Coward, where Coward introduced Fleming to Charlie Chaplin. Fleming had asked Coward to set up the meeting as Chaplin was writing his memoirs and Leonard Russell had asked Fleming to secure the rights for the paper; Fleming was successful in his approach and the memoirs were later serialised in the paper.

Fleming's wife Ann had joined him in Les Avants and the couple then moved on to Naples, where Fleming interviewed Lucky Luciano, finding him "a neat, quiet, grey-haired man with a tired good-looking face." After Naples, the Flemings moved to Monte Carlo, the final stop on Fleming's journey; Despite spending time at the casino, Fleming thought Monte Carlo somewhat seedy.

The second series of articles started on 31 July 1960 with Fleming's trip to Hamburg, and finished with his visit to Monte Carlo. Overall the series was considered popular and successful.

Release and reception
Thrilling Cities was first published in the UK by Jonathan Cape, in November 1963; the book was 223 pages long and cost 30 shillings. The cover was designed by artist Paul Davis and shows "a surreal version of Monte Carlo". For the US market, the book was released in June 1964 through New American Library and cost $4.95.

Fleming's comments on New York were so cutting that when the book was published in the US, the American publishers asked if he could tone down the wording. Fleming refused, but instead wrote the short story "007 in New York" to be included in the US version by way of recompense.

Reviews
The reviews for Thrilling Cities were broadly good. The critic for The Times thought that Fleming's style was "no nonsense over fine writing", and summed up the book as "Fleming's smooth, sophisticated, personally conducted tours", noting that the author "has a knack of enjoying himself". John Raymond, in The Sunday Times, wrote that "Mr Fleming's prose arouses the voyeur that lurks in all but the best of us", and considered that the book remained "supremely readable" throughout. Writing for The Times Literary Supplement, Xan Fielding found the title of the book to be misleading, noting that apart from a very small win at the casinos of Las Vegas, "his personal experience of thrills seems to have been just as limited everywhere else on his itinerary." Fielding considered that the cities Fleming visited had the potential for thrills, and hoped that the material gathered was used in Fleming's literary works with thrills included.

Christopher Wordsworth, writing for The Listener, believed that Thrilling Cities was "a fascinating informative mock-up, disarmingly snob-ridden". Writing for the Daily Express, Peter Grosvenor thought that Fleming—a "tourist extraordinary"—was "never afraid to record a controversial view", citing Fleming's views on the differences between oriental and western women's approaches to men.

The critic for The Financial Times, James Bredin, declared that Thrilling Cities "can—and will, compulsively—be read at a sitting", although he found that overall "it is an unsatisfying report" because of the brevity of the subject. Honor Tracy, providing the critique for The Guardian thought Fleming praiseworthy, as he "writes without any pretension at all", while also managing to be "invariably entertaining and often funny". Overall Tracy considered that Thrilling Cities was "a lively, enjoyable book, written from an unusual point of view and well illustrated." Writing for The Observer, Francis Hope was surprised by Fleming's written style, which he found to be "more flabby verbose than one expects of a thriller writer", although this was redeemed by Fleming having "some interesting conversations with local experts on crime".

The reviewer for the Los Angeles Times, Robert Kirsch, did not enjoy the book and considered Fleming to be "a second-rate reporter, filled with the irritating prejudices and pomposities of a middle-class English traveller." For Kirsch, Fleming's style was a combination of Sax Rohmer and James Fitzpatrick, although he also considered that "Fleming's wit is provincial". Writing the review for The Boston Globe, Marjory Adams thought Thrilling Cities to have "an acid gaiety in its descriptions", which contributed to her overall summary of the book: "it is fun!"

References

Bibliography

External links
 

1963 non-fiction books
Books by Ian Fleming
Jonathan Cape books
Travelogues